General James Alexander St Clair-Erskine, 3rd Earl of Rosslyn PC, DL (15 February 1802 – 16 June 1866), styled Lord Loughborough from 1805 to 1837, was a Scottish soldier and Tory politician. A General in the British Army, he also held political office as Master of the Buckhounds between 1841 and 1846 and again in 1852 and as Under-Secretary of State for War in 1859.

Early life
Rosslyn was the son of James St Clair-Erskine, 2nd Earl of Rosslyn, by his wife Harriet Elizabeth Bouverie, daughter of the Hon. Edward Bouverie (the second son of Jacob Bouverie, 1st Viscount Folkestone).

Career
Rosslyn entered the British Army in 1819. He purchased a captaincy in the 9th Light Dragoons in 1823 and a lieutenant-colonelcy in 1828. He was promoted to Major-General in 1854, to Lieutenant-General in 1859 and to full General on 20 April 1866.

In 1864 he was appointed Regimental Colonel of the 7th Queen's Own Hussars after the death of General Sir William Tuyll. Lord Rosslyn also commanded the Auxiliary Cavalry Regiment, The Fife Mounted Rifle Volunteers from 1860 until his death in 1866.

Political career
Rosslyn was returned to Parliament for Dysart Burghs, in Fife, in 1830, a seat he held until 1831, and then represented Grimsby from 1831 to 1832. He succeeded his father in the earldom in 1837. In 1841 he was sworn of the Privy Council and appointed Master of the Buckhounds under Sir Robert Peel, which he remained until the government fell in 1846. He held the same office from February to December 1852 under Lord Derby, and was briefly Under-Secretary of State for War under Derby from March to June 1859.

Lord Rosslyn was also a Deputy Lieutenant for Fife.

Personal life
In 1826, James married Frances Wemyss (1794–1858), daughter of Lt.-Gen. William Wemyss, of Wemyss Castle, Fife. Together, they were the parents of two sons and a daughter, including:

 Hon. James Alexander George St Clair-Erskine (1830–1851), styled Lord Loughborough, a Lieut. who died unmarried. 
 Robert Francis St Clair-Erskine, 4th Earl of Rosslyn, who married Blanche Adeliza FitzRoy, great-granddaughter of Augustus FitzRoy, 3rd Duke of Grafton and widow of Col. Hon. Charles Henry Maynard. 
 Lady Harriet Elizabeth St Clair-Erskine (d. 1867), who married Prince Georg Münster, Hereditary Marshal of Hanover and Hanoverian Ambassador to London (d. 1902) in 1865.

Lady Rosslyn died on 30 September 1858 and Lord Rosslyn died, several years later, in June 1866, aged 64.  He was succeeded in the earldom by his only surviving son, Robert.

References

External links 

1802 births
1866 deaths
Earls in the Peerage of the United Kingdom
Scottish Tory MPs (pre-1912)
Conservative Party (UK) hereditary peers
Members of the Parliament of the United Kingdom for Fife constituencies
UK MPs 1830–1831
UK MPs 1831–1832
Rosslyn, E3
Fife and Forfar Yeomanry officers
Conservative Party (UK) MPs for English constituencies
Members of the Privy Council of the United Kingdom
Members of the Parliament of the United Kingdom for Great Grimsby
Masters of the Buckhounds
James